This page includes a list of biblical proper names that start with T in English transcription. Some of the names are given with a proposed etymological meaning. For further information on the names included on the list, the reader may consult the sources listed below in the References and External Links.

A – B – C – D – E – F – G – H – I – J – K – L – M – N – O – P – Q – R – S – T – U – V – Y – Z

T

Taanach
Taanach-shilo
Tabbath
Tabbaoth
Tabeal
Tabelel
Taberah
Tabering
Tabitha
Tabor
Tabrimon
Tadmor
Tahan
Tahapenes
Tahath
Tahpenes
Tahrea
Talitha-cumi
Talmai
Tamah
Tamar
Tammuz
Tanhumeth
Taphath
Tappuah
Tarah
Taralah
Tarea
Tarpelites
Tarshish
Tarsus
Tartak
Tartan
Tatnai
Tebah
Tebaliah
Tebeth
Tehinnah
Tekel
Tekoa
Telabib
Telah
Telassar
Telem
Telharsa
Tel-melah
Tema
Teman
Terah
Teraphim
Tertius
Tertullus
Tetrarch
Thaddeus
Thahash
Thamah
Thamar
Tharah
Thebez
Thelasar
Theophilus
Thessalonica
Theudas
Thomas
Thuhash
Thummim
Thyatira
Tibbath
Tiberias
Tiberius
Tibni
Tidal
Tiglath-Pileser
Tikvah
Tilon
Timeus
Timnah
Timnath
Timnath-heres
Timon
Timothy
Timotheus
Tiphsah
Tire
Tirhakah
Tiria
Tirras
Tirshatha
Tirza
Tirzah
Tishbite
Titus
Toah
Tob
Tob-adonijah
Tobiah
Toby
Tochen
Togarmah
Tohu
Toi
Tola
Tophet
Topheth
Trachonitis
Troas
Trophimus
Tryphena
Tryphon
Tryphosa
Tubal
Tubal-Cain
Tychicus
Tyrannus
Tyrus

References
Comay, Joan, Who's Who in the Old Testament, Oxford University Press, 1971,  
Lockyer, Herbert, All the men of the Bible, Zondervan Publishing House (Grand Rapids, Michigan), 1958
Lockyer, Herbert, All the women of the Bible, Zondervan Publishing 1988, 
Lockyer, Herbert, All the Divine Names and Titles in the Bible, Zondervan Publishing 1988,  
Tischler, Nancy M., All things in the Bible: an encyclopedia of the biblical world , Greenwood Publishing, Westport, Conn. : 2006

Inline references
 

T